Uncial 0161 (in the Gregory-Aland numbering), ε 019 (von Soden), is a Greek uncial manuscript of the New Testament, dated paleographically to the 8th century.

Description 

The codex contains a small part of the Gospel of Matthew 22:7-46, on one parchment leaf (22 cm by 16 cm). It is written in two columns per page, 37 lines per page, in small uncial letters. It is a palimpsest, the upper text contains Greek notes, bound with the minuscule codex 1419.

The Greek text of this codex is mixed, but with strong the Byzantine element. Aland placed it in Category III.

It was the last uncial manuscript classified by Caspar René Gregory. Gregory saw it in 1904.

Currently it is dated by the INTF to the 8th century.

The codex currently is housed at the Εθνική Βιβλιοθήκη (139, ff. 245–246) in Athens.

See also 

 List of New Testament uncials
 Textual criticism

References

Further reading 
 

Greek New Testament uncials
8th-century biblical manuscripts
Palimpsests
Manuscripts of the National Library of Greece